Said Nursi (‎; 1877 – 23 March 1960), also spelled Said-i Nursî or Said-i Kurdî, and commonly known with the honorifics Bediüzzaman (meaning "wonder of the age") and Üstad (meaning "master") among his followers, was a Kurdish Sunni Muslim theologian who wrote the Risale-i Nur Collection, a body of Qur'anic commentary exceeding six thousand pages. Believing that modern science and logic was the way of the future, he advocated teaching religious sciences in secular schools and modern sciences in religious schools. 

Nursi inspired a religious movement that has played a vital role in the revival of Islam in Turkey and now numbers several millions of followers worldwide. His followers, often known as the "Nurcu movement" or the "Nur cemaati". In a 2008 publication Nurcu worldwide adherents were estimated at 5 to 6 millions with numbers going up to 9 millions, with around 5500 dershanes or study halls where adherents would read Nursi’s writings collectively.

He was able to recite many books from memory. For instance: "So then he [Molla Fethullah] decided to test his memory and handed him a copy of the work by Al-Hariri of Basra (1054–1122) — also famous for his intelligence and power of memory — called Maqamat al-Hariri. Said read one page once, memorized it, then repeated it by heart. Molla Fethullah expressed his amazement."

Early life
Said Nursi was born in the Kurdish village of Nurs near Hizan in the Bitlis Vilayet of the Ottoman Empire. He received his early education from scholars of his hometown, where he showed mastery in theological debates. After developing a reputation for Islamic knowledge, he was nicknamed "Bediüzzaman", meaning "The most unique and superior person of the time". He was invited by the governor of the Vilayet of Van to stay within his residency. In the library of the governor, Nursi gained access to an archive of scientific knowledge he had not had access to previously. Said Nursi also learned the Ottoman Turkish language there. During this time, he developed a plan for university education for the Eastern provinces of the Ottoman Empire. By combining scientific and religious (Islamic) education, the university was expected to advance the philosophical thoughts of these regions. Although subsequently he twice received funds for the construction of his university, and its foundations were laid in 1913, it was never completed due to war.

Contrary to the practice of religious scholars at that time, Nursi himself studied and mastered almost all the physical and mathematical sciences, and later studied philosophy. In the course of time, modern sciences had been dropped from the religious schools curriculum, which had contributed directly to the Ottoman decline relative to the advance of the West. Nursi’s endeavor was to prove and demonstrate that Islam is compatible with modern sciences and progress, the Holy Book Quran was the source of true progress and civilization.

The years up to the end of the First World War were the final decades of the Ottoman Empire and were, in the words of Nursi, the period of the ‘Old Said’. In additions to his endeavors in the field of learning, he has had active involvement in social life and the public domain. In the War, he commanded the militia forces on the Caucasian Front against the invading Russians, for which he as later awarded a War Medal. He would enter the trenches himself despite heavy shelling which earned him the admiration of the troops he commanded. It was during these expereinces that he allegedly wrote his Koranic commentary, Signs of Miraculousness dictating to a scribe while on horseback.  His commentary argues that the Koran encompasses the knowledge which allows for modern science. The commentary, in Nursi’s words, forms a sort model for commentaries he hoped would be written in the future fusing Islam and modern science. Nursi was taken prisoner in March 1916 and held in Russia for two years before escaping in early 1918, and returning to Istanbul via Warsaw, Berlin, and Vienna.

Nursi's influence concerned the incipient leader of the Turkish Republic, Mustafa Kemal Atatürk, which lead to Ataturk offering Nursi the post ‘Minister of Religious Affairs" for the eastern provinces of Turkey in attempt to make sure Nursi would not oppose Ataturk's regime, a post that Nursi famously refused. This was the beginning of his split from the Kemalist circle. Conversely to the authority offered to Kursi, the secular government in the Republic of Turkey would later stigmatize his attempts to renew traditional faith. Modernization of intellectual culture in Anatolia thusly bifurcated along two approaches; assimilation of occidental understanding; and functionalization of extant liturgics. Nursi was the major contributor to the latter approach, and his early life as a memorization savant enabled him to use scripture for teaching with mnemonic metaphor. Friction between the two spheres of thought led to breakdowns of civility and the eventual reclusion of Nursi.

After arriving in Istanbul, Nursi allegedly declared: "I shall prove and demonstrate to the world that the Quran is an undying, inexhaustible Sun!", and set out to write his comprehensive Risale-i Nur, a collection of Said Nursi's own commentaries and interpretations of the Quran and Islam, as well as writings about his own life.

Teachings and movement 

Humanity faced the greatest corruption of this period and the danger of unbelief, which was the greatest threat to humanity. Therefore, according to him, the greatest service in this period was the service of faith rescue, and Risale-i Nur, who did this duty properly, represented the great Mahdism of the End Times. However, he was carrying out the first and most important steps of this task, which he called "the service of faith and the Quran" with his books called "Risale-i nur", and was preparing the ground and program for another person to come after him.

The period believed to be the "golden age of Mahdi" will come in the future, and after this period that will last 30–40 years, irreligion will prevail again. According to him, the Doomsday would fall on the heads of the atheists in the Hijri calendar between 1530 and 1540.

Said Nursi was exiled to the Isparta Province for, amongst other things, performing the call to prayer in the Arabic language. After his teachings attracted people in the area, the governor of Isparta sent him to a village named Barla where he wrote two-thirds of his Risale-i Nur. These manuscripts were sent to Sav, another village in the region, where people duplicated them in Arabic script (which was officially replaced by the modern Turkish alphabet in 1928). After being finished, these books were sent to Nursi's disciples all over Turkey via the "Nurcu postal system". Nursi repeatedly stated that all the persecutions and hardships inflicted on him by the secularist regime were God's blessings and that having destroyed the formal religious establishment, they had unwittingly left popular Islam as the only authentic faith of the Turks.

Besides these writings themselves, a major factor in the success of the movement may be attributed to the very method Nursi had chosen, which may be summarized with two phrases: 'mânevî jihad,' that is, 'jihad of the word' or 'non-physical jihad', and 'positive action.' Nursi considered materialism and atheism and their source materialist philosophy to be his true enemies in this age of science, reason, and civilization. He combated them with reasoned proofs in the Risale-i Nur, considering the Risale-i Nur as the most effective barrier against the corruption of society caused by these enemies. In order to be able to pursue this 'jihad of the word,' Nursi insisted that his students avoided any use of force and disruptive action. Through 'positive action,' and the maintenance of public order and security, the supposed damage caused by the forces of unbelief could be 'repaired' by the 'healing' truths of the Quran. Said Nursi lived much of his life in prison and in exile, persecuted by the secularist state for having invested in religious revival.

Later life 
Alarmed by the growing popularity of Nursi's teachings, which had spread even among the intellectuals and the military officers, the government arrested him for allegedly violating laws mandating secularism and sent him to exile. He was acquitted of all these charges in 1956.

In the last decade of his life, Said Nursi settled in the city of Isparta. After the introduction of the multi-party system, he advised his followers to vote for the Democratic Party of Adnan Menderes, which had restored some religious freedom. Said Nursi was a staunch anti-Communist, denouncing Communism as the greatest danger of the time. In 1956, he was allowed to have his writings printed. His books are collected under the name Risale-i Nur ("Letters of Divine Light").

He died of exhaustion after travelling to Urfa. He was buried in a tomb opposite the cave where prophet Ibrahim (Abraham) is widely believed to have been born. After the military coup d'état in Turkey in 1960, a group of soldiers led by the later right-wing politician Alparslan Türkeş opened his grave and buried him at an unknown place near Isparta during July 1960 in order to prevent popular veneration.

In popular culture
A Turkish film Free Man based on Nursi's biography was made in 2011.

See also

 God's Faithful Servant: Barla
 Muhammad Emin Er (1914-2013), one of Said Nursi's students
 Bediüzzaman Museum, a museum inside the Rüstem Pasha Medrese at Fatih, Istanbul
 Mustafa Sabri
 Fethullah Gülen
 Adnan Oktar

References

Sources
 
 Sahiner, Necmettin, Son Sahitler 3, Nesil Yayinlari, 2004.

Further reading
 
 
 
 
 
 Thomas F. Michel (2013). Insights from the Risale-i Nur: Said Nursi's Advice for Modern Believers Clifton, NJ: Tughra Books 
 
 
 Mustafa Gökhan Sahin, Said Nursi and the Nur Movement in Turkey: An Atomistic Approach

External links
 
 Biodata at MuslimScholars.info
 Bediuzzaman Said Nursi
 SaidNur.com – A comprehensive page about Said Nursi and Risale-i Nur Collection in many languages
 Suffa Vakfi – Said Nursi-based Organization.
 Risale-i Nur
 The Risale-i Nur Collection, Bediuzzaman, Bediüzzaman Said Nursi – A web page including Risale-i Nur Collection in various languages
 Risale-i A web page including Risale-i Nur Collection in English
 Academic Researches on Said Nursi
 A letter about ban of Risale-i Nur Collection to President of Russia Medvedev
 A short biography of Said Nursi

Asharis
Shafi'is
Sunni Sufis
Mujaddid
People from Hizan
Turkish Kurdish people
Ottoman military personnel of World War I
Ottoman prisoners of war
World War I prisoners of war held by Russia
Escapees from Russian detention
Scholars of Sufism
Turkish escapees
Critics of atheism
Muslim creationists
Members of the Special Organization (Ottoman Empire)
Quranic exegesis scholars
20th-century Muslim scholars of Islam
Sunni Muslim scholars of Islam
Kurdish scholars
Kurdish theologians
Kurdish Sunni Muslims
1878 births
1960 deaths
Turkish anti-communists